Araklıspor is a professional Turkish football club located in the Araklı district of Trabzon. The club was formed in 1961. The club colours are black and green. Araklıspor play their home matches at Araklı Stadium.

Sport in Trabzon
Football clubs in Turkey
1961 establishments in Turkey